Roseville Plantation, also known as Floyd's, is a historic plantation home located near Aylett, King William County, Virginia.  The main house was built in 1807, and is a -story, four bay, frame dwelling in the Federal style. It sits on a brick foundation and is clad in weatherboard. Also on the property are the contributing one-story, one-bay detached frame kitchen; a one-story, two-bay frame school; a large, one-story, single-bay frame granary; a privy, a 1930s era barn, and two chicken houses, of which one has been converted to an equipment shed.  The property also includes a slave cemetery and Ryland family cemetery.

It was listed on the National Register of Historic Places in 2007.

References

External links
Roseville, State Route 604 vicinity, Mangohick, King William County, VA: 3 photos at Historic American Buildings Survey

Historic American Buildings Survey in Virginia
Houses on the National Register of Historic Places in Virginia
Federal architecture in Virginia
Houses completed in 1807
Houses in King William County, Virginia
National Register of Historic Places in King William County, Virginia
Burial grounds of the African diaspora in the Western hemisphere